Route nationale 618 or RN 618  was a French national road linking Saint-Jean-de-Luz (on the Atlantic Ocean) to Argelès-sur-Mer (on the Mediterranean). En route it crossed many of the famous passes in the Pyrenees, immortalized by the Tour de France;  hence its name was the "Route of the Pyrénées". In 1970, the road was down-graded and is now the RD 918 from Saint-Jean-de-Luz to Arreau and the RD 618 from Arreau to Argelès Plage.

Itinerary 
The places named in italic are mountain passes used in the Tour de France.

Saint-Jean-de-Luz
Cambo-les-Bains
Saint-Jean-Pied-de-Port

Common with the former RN 133

Larceveau-Arros-Cibits
Mauléon-Licharre
Issor

Common with RN 134

Lurbe-Saint-Christau
Arudy

Common with the former RN 134BIS

Laruns
Col d'Aubisque
Col du Soulor
Arrens-Marsous
Argelès-Gazost

Common with the former RN 21

Luz-Saint-Sauveur
Barèges
Col du Tourmalet
Sainte-Marie-de-Campan
Col d'Aspin
Arreau
Col de Peyresourde
Bagnères-de-Luchon

Common with the former RN 125

Saint-Mamet
Col du Portillon, Spanish frontier.

Route interrupted by the Spanish border

Chaum
Col des Ares
Juzet-d'Izaut
Col de Portet d'Aspet
Saint-Lary
Audressein
Saint-Girons
Massat
Col de Port
Tarascon-sur-Ariège

Common with RN 20

Ur
Font-Romeu
Mont-Louis

Common with RN 116

Bouleternère
Amélie-les-Bains-Palalda

Common with the former RN 115

Céret
Le Boulou
Argelès-sur-Mer
Argelès Plage

618